The 2012–13 Mestis season was the 13th season of the Mestis, the second level of ice hockey in Finland. Twelve teams participated in the league, and Jukurit won the championship.

Regular season

Playoffs

SM-Liiga promotion

Tampereen Ilves remained in the SM-Liiga.

Qualification

Play-outs
 K-Vantaa - HCK 4:1 on series.

Qualification round

External links
 Official website

Fin
2012–13 in Finnish ice hockey
Mestis seasons